Pivmecillinam (INN) or amdinocillin pivoxil (USAN, trade names Selexid, Penomax and Coactabs) is an orally active prodrug of mecillinam, an extended-spectrum penicillin antibiotic. Pivmecillinam is the pivaloyloxymethyl ester of mecillinam. 

Pivmecillinam is only considered to be active against Gram-negative bacteria, and is used primarily in the treatment of lower urinary tract infections. In the Nordic countries, it has been widely used in that indication since the 1970s. It has been proposed as the first-line drug of choice for empirical treatment of acute cystitis. It has also been used to treat paratyphoid fever and shigellosis.

Activity

Adverse effects

The adverse effect profile of pivmecillinam is similar to that of other penicillins. The most common side effects of mecillinam use are rash and gastrointestinal upset, including nausea and vomiting.

Prodrugs that release pivalic acid when broken down by the body — such as pivmecillinam, pivampicillin and cefditoren pivoxil — have long been known to deplete levels of carnitine. This is not due to the drug itself, but to pivalate, which is mostly removed from the body by forming a conjugate with carnitine. Although short-term use of these drugs can cause a marked decrease in blood levels of carnitine, it is unlikely to be of clinical significance; long-term use, however, appears problematic and is not recommended.

References

Penicillins
Azepanes
Prodrugs
Formals